Disco Jets is a tongue in cheek project organized and recorded by Todd Rundgren and Utopia shortly after recording Rundgren's Faithful LP and including most of the musicians from those sessions. It's an instrumental recording humorously parodying 1976's US Bicentennial celebrations, disco music, science fiction films and the CB radio fads. It was released in 2001, 25 years after its recording, as part of the Todd Archive Series Vol. 4 - "Todd Rundgren Demos and Lost Albums" (Rhino CRCL-7707/08) 2-CD set on Rhino Entertainment/Crown Japan. It was reissued in 2012 as a standalone CD import on Esoteric Recordings and in 2015 on Cherry Red. It was also released as a limited edition vinyl that was manufactured exclusively by Cherry Red for Record Store Day, only appearing in record shops from Saturday 16 April.

The album was the last Utopia project with bassist John Siegler, replaced shortly after  by Kasim Sulton. Greg Prato commented on Allmusic that "the album seems to be a bridge of sorts between Utopia's earlier prog rock direction and their forthcoming more 'streamlined' direction."

Track listing
All songs written by Todd Rundgren, Roger Powell, John Siegler and Willie Wilcox, except where noted.
 "Disco Jets" – 3:33
 "Cosmic Convoy" – 3:13
 "Time Warp"  (Rick Derringer) – 2:30
 "V.H.F" – 3:47
 "Star Trek"  (Alexander Courage) – 4:07
 "Pet Rock" – 3:23
 "Space War" – 3:25
 "Rising Sign" – 3:48
 "Black Hole" – 3:19
 "Spirit Of '76" – 2:48

Personnel
Todd Rundgren – guitar, vocals, production 
Roger Powell – trumpet, keyboards, production
John Siegler – bass, cello, production
 John "Willie" Wilcox – drums, production

References

1976 debut albums
Todd Rundgren albums
Albums produced by Todd Rundgren
Utopia (band) albums
Citizens band radio in popular culture